Engh is a surname. Notable people with the surname include:

Inga Bejer Engh (born 1970), Norwegian jurist and prosecutor
John Engh (1915–1996), Norwegian architect, most known for his innovative work in stone and concrete
M. J. Engh (born 1933), science fiction author and independent Roman scholar
Michael Engh (born 1949), American Jesuit, academic and historian
Odd Arne Engh (born 1951), Norwegian Nordic combined skier